Roman Chanturia (born 9 February 1996) is a Georgian football player.

Club career
He made his professional debut in the Segunda Liga for Olhanense on 15 February 2017 in a game against União da Madeira.

On 17 August 2018, he joined Maltese club Senglea Athletic on loan.

References

External links
 

1996 births
Footballers from Tbilisi
Living people
Footballers from Georgia (country)
Association football forwards
Georgia (country) youth international footballers
Georgia (country) under-21 international footballers
S.C. Olhanense players
Expatriate footballers in Portugal
A.C. Prato players
FC Lokomotivi Tbilisi players
Senglea Athletic F.C. players
FC Dinamo Batumi players
Liga Portugal 2 players
Serie C players
Maltese Premier League players
Erovnuli Liga players
Expatriate footballers from Georgia (country)
Expatriate footballers in Italy
Expatriate footballers in Malta